Elophila faulalis is a moth in the family Crambidae. It was described by Francis Walker in 1859. It is found in North America, where it has been recorded from Alabama, Florida, Maine, Maryland, Mississippi, Ohio, Ontario, Quebec and South Carolina.

Adults have been recorded nearly year round.

References

Acentropinae
Moths described in 1859
Moths of North America